The Salicaceae is the willow family of flowering plants. The traditional family (Salicaceae sensu stricto) included the willows, poplar, aspen, and cottonwoods. Genetic studies summarized by the Angiosperm Phylogeny Group (APG) have greatly expanded the circumscription of the family to contain 56 genera and about 1220 species, including the Scyphostegiaceae and many of the former Flacourtiaceae.

In the Cronquist system, the Salicaceae were assigned to their own order, Salicales, and contained three genera (Salix, Populus, and Chosenia). Recognized to be closely related to the Violaceae and Passifloraceae, the family is placed by the APG in the order Malpighiales.

Under the new circumscription, all members of the family are trees or shrubs that have simple leaves with alternate arrangement and temperate members are usually deciduous. Most members have serrate or dentate leaf margins, and those that have such toothed margins all exhibit salicoid teeth; a salicoid tooth being one in which a vein enters the tooth, expands, and terminates at or near the apex, near which are spherical and glandular protuberances called setae. Members of the family often have flowers which are reduced and inconspicuous, and all have ovaries that are superior or half-inferior with parietal placentation.

Genera by subfamily and tribe
Salicaceae is divided into three subfamilies, with Salicoideae further divided into six tribes.

Salicoideae

Abatieae
Abatia Ruiz & Pavón (formerly including Aphaerema)
Aphaerema Miers
Bembicieae
Bembicia Oliver
Homalieae
Bartholomaea Standley & Steyermark
Bivinia Tulasne
Byrsanthus Guillemin
Calantica Tulasne
Dissomeria Bentham
Homalium Jacquin
Neopringlea S. Watson
Trimeria Harvey
Prockieae
Banara Aublet
Hasseltia Kunth
Hasseltiopsis Sleumer
Macrohasseltia L. O. Williams
Neosprucea Sleumer
Pineda Ruiz & Pavón
Pleuranthodendron L. O. Williams
Prockia L.
Saliceae
Azara Ruiz & Pavón
Bennettiodendron Merrill
Carrierea Franchet
Dovyalis Arnott
Flacourtia L'Heritier
Idesia Maximowicz
Itoa Hemsley
Lasiochlamys Pax & K. Hoffmann
Ludia de Jussieu
Olmediella Baillon
Poliothyrsis Oliver
Populus L.
Priamosia Urban
†Pseudosalix Boucher, Manchester, & Judd
Salix L.
Tisonia Baillon
Xylosma G. Forster (formerly including Priamosia)
Scolopieae
Hemiscolopia van Slooten
Phyllobotryon Müller
Pseudoscolopia Gilg
Scolopia Schreber

Samydoideae

Casearia Jacquin (including Hecatostemon, Laetia, Samyda, & Zuelania)
Euceraea Martius
Irenodendron Alford & Dement
Lunania Hooker
Neoptychocarpus Buchheim
Ophiobotrys Gilg
Osmelia Thwaites
Piparea Aublet
Pseudosmelia Sleumer
Ryania Vahl
Tetrathylacium Poeppig & Endlicher
Trichostephanus Gilg

Scyphostegioideae
Dianyuea C. Shang et al.
Scyphostegia Stapf

incertae sedis
Ahernia Merrill
Mocquerysia Hua
Oncoba Forsskahl
†Saxifragispermum Reid & Chandler
†Utkholokia (Cheleb.) Iljinskaja & Chelb.

References

External links

 
Malpighiales families